The 1936 Baylor Bears football team represented Baylor University in the Southwest Conference (SWC) during the 1936 college football season. In their 11th season under head coach Morley Jennings, the Bears compiled a 6–3–1 record (3–2–1 against conference opponents), tied for third place in the conference, and outscored opponents by a combined total of 128 to 90. They played their home games at Waco Stadium in Waco, Texas. Lloyd O. Russell was the team captain.

Schedule

References

Baylor
Baylor Bears football seasons
Baylor Bears football